The  Universidad Tecnológica de Bolívar  is an institution of higher education in Colombia. accredited high quality in 2011. In 2015 it was recognized as the third best undergraduate university in the country according to the MIDE.  From its foundation in the year of 1970, the university has come outlining like one of the most modern educative centres in the north of Colombia.

Characteristics and location 

The technological University of Bolivar - UTB- is a bilingual institution with the international vocation, located in Cartagena de Indias. The companies of the city are the corporative partners of the university from 1975. Today the Technological account with two modern own Campuses: Campus of Lemaitre's House in Manga neighborhood and The Technologic Campus located to the outskirts of Cartagena in the Industrial Park and Technological “Carlos Vélez Pombo” in Ternera neighborhood . Both seats are composed by modern constructions;equipped with laboratories, complete factories, rooms of computer science, outpost technology and 2 modern libraries, the one of them, greatest one of the district of Cartagena.

History 

Founded August 5 of 1970 as an institution of superior education that offered technological careers was the first private university established in Cartagena, from its first years, the Technological one was defining and consolidating its enterprise vocation, intention to which the five main economic unions of Cartagena were added in 1975 (ANDI, ACOPI, CAMACOL, FENALCO and the Chamber of Commerce), to orient its development towards the impulse of the industry and the industrialist, and the fortification of the competitiveness of Cartagena and the Caribbean.

Happened more than three decades of its foundation, the Technological University of Bolivar has fortified its relations with several national and international universities by means of the sophisticated system of Virtual University in a current of unstoppable development. November 28 of 2003, after demonstrating to an investigativo development of quality with projection and regional impact, the Technological one of Bolivar is recognized like University by the Ministry of National Education, by means of the Resolution No 2996.

Projection the International 

The UTB is consolidating its international vocation and its academic-multilingual community. The visitors, students, invited assistants of languages and professors who have passed through this institution have arrived from countries such as Czech Republic, United Kingdom, Virgin Poland, Russia, Germany, Taiwan, Canada, Cuba, the United States and Mexico.

The UTB is working towards the creation of an international curriculum. The academic programs of Undergrad will be reduced from five to four years and professors use investigation articles in English to encourage bilingualism and investigation.

The university is trying to create connections with other universities in the world to foment mobility of the student and the professor. At the moment has agreements with various countries in Latin America, Europe, Canada, Asia and Australia.

Programs offered at the present time

Programs of predegree 
Faculty of Engineerings
 Environmental Engineering 
 Civil Engineering 
 Electrical Engineering 
 Electronic Engineering 
 Industrial Engineering 
 Mechanical Engineering 
 Mecatrónica Engineering 
 Engineering of Systems 
 Technology in Systems
Faculty of Economic and Administrative Sciences 
 Economy 
 Public Accountant's office 
 Administration of Companies 
 International Finances and Businesses
Faculty of Social and Human Sciences 
 Psychology 
 Social Communication 
 Political Science and International Relations
 Law
semiactual Programs in agreement with Uniminuto 
 Degree in basic education with emphasis in technology and computer science 
 Degree in basic education with emphasis in artistic education

External links
 web site of the UTB

Universidad Tecnologica de Bolivar|technological University of Bolivar
1970 establishments in Colombia
Educational institutions established in 1970